Tana Talk 3 is the debut studio album by American rapper Benny the Butcher.
It was released on November 23, 2018 through Griselda Records and Black Soprano Family.
The album is exclusively produced by The Alchemist and Daringer.
It features guest appearances by labelmates Conway the Machine and Westside Gunn and other appearances by Keisha Plum, Meyhem Lauren, Melanie Rutherford and Royce da 5'9".

Background
The name of the album is a reference to Montana Avenue in Buffalo, New York.
The cover is a baby painting of his deceased older brother, Machine Gun Black.

Singles
On November 13, 2018, Benny the Butcher released the lead single "Joe Pesci 38" ten days before the release of the album.
The second single of the album, "Broken Bottles", was released on November 26, 2018.

Track listing

Credits adapted from Tidal.

References

2018 debut albums
East Coast hip hop albums
Griselda Records albums
Albums produced by the Alchemist (musician)
Albums produced by Daringer (producer)